A special election was held in  on September 17, 1804 to fill a vacancy left by the resignation of Thomson J. Skinner (DR) on August 10, 1804

Election results

Larned took his seat on November 5, 1804, at the start of the 2nd session

See also
List of special elections to the United States House of Representatives
 United States House of Representatives elections, 1804 and 1805

References

United States House of Representatives 1804 12
Massachusetts 1804 12
Massachusetts 1804 12
1804 12
Massachusetts 12
1804 Massachusetts elections